Frederick ("Fred") Onyancha (born 25 December 1969 in Nyamira) is a Kenyan 800 metres runner who won the bronze medal at the 1996 Summer Olympics in Atlanta in a personal best time of 1:42.79 minutes.

External links

1969 births
Living people
Kenyan male middle-distance runners
Athletes (track and field) at the 1996 Summer Olympics
Olympic athletes of Kenya
Olympic bronze medalists for Kenya
Medalists at the 1996 Summer Olympics
Olympic bronze medalists in athletics (track and field)